Stumped is a 2003 Bollywood sport/drama film written and directed by Gaurav Pandey and produced by Raveena Tandon. This film is a debut for Raveena as producer.  Cricketing icon Sachin Tendulkar and actor Salman Khan had a cameo appearance in the film.

Despite a notable promotional campaign, the film had little impact after its release.

Cast

Plot
Reena and her husband Major Raghav Seth; Ranga Khetrapal, Swadesh Deshpande and their respective wives; Laltu Singh, his wife, Neetu, and son, Bhola; the building watchman, Dukhiram; bachelor Subramaniam; and a visually-challenged Holy man, Baba, are some of the residents in Happy Home Society. The common interest shared by most of them is their love of playing and watching cricket. Reena experiences isolation after her husband is called back to Kargil to battle terrorists. She is befriended by three youngsters who have a crush on her. Things, however, change dramatically after she gets word that her husband is missing and believed dead. But by the end of the film it is revealed that the husband is miraculously alive and reunites with Reena.

Soundtrack

The Music was Composed by Pritam Chakraborty and lyrics was penned by Abbas Tyrewala except two tracks "Naam Apna", which was sung, composed and written by Zubeen Garg and "Tanha Dil" which was sung and written by Shaan and composed by Ram Sampath, however, both were added as hidden tracks and are not used in the film and not mentioned on the tracklist. It was Pritam's first solo album.

References

External links

Films about cricket in India
2000s sports comedy-drama films
2000s Hindi-language films
2003 films
Films directed by Gaurav Pandey
Films featuring songs by Pritam
Indian sports comedy-drama films
2003 comedy-drama films
India–Pakistan relations in popular culture
Indian Army in films